Kansas Cyclone is a 1941 American Western film directed by George Sherman and written by Oliver Drake and Doris Schroeder. The film stars Don "Red" Barry, Lynn Merrick, William Haade, Milton Kibbee, Harry Worth and Dorothy Sebastian. The film was released on June 24, 1941, by Republic Pictures.

Plot
Marshall and Geologist Jim Randall goes to investigate some ore robberies, he finds out that Parker is stealing ore from other miners and selling it as his own. Things go bad when Parker gets the mine owner killed and blames it on Jim.

Cast 
Don "Red" Barry as Jim Randall
Lynn Merrick as Martha King
William Haade as Sheriff Ed King
Milton Kibbee as Cal Chambers
Harry J. Worth as Jud Parker
Dorothy Sebastian as Helen King
Jack Kirk as Turner
Forrest Taylor as Ben Brown
Charles R. Moore as T-Bone

References

External links
 

1941 films
1940s English-language films
American Western (genre) films
1941 Western (genre) films
Republic Pictures films
Films directed by George Sherman
American black-and-white films
Films scored by Paul Sawtell
1940s American films